Julian Malins, KC (1 May 1950) is a British barrister and a Reform U.K. candidate who served as the Farringdon ward councillor of the City of London and a Governor of the Museum of London.

Early life
Malins was born in Rinteln, West Germany, where his father served as an army vicar. Brought up in Ghana, Nigeria and Singapore, he was educated at Brasenose College, Oxford. He studied at The College of Law, and was called to the Bar of England and Wales in 1972 by the Middle Temple and subsequently to the Bars of the Cayman Islands and British Virgin Islands and on a case-by-case basis to other Bars. He was pupil to Baron Alexander of Weedon QC.

Legal career
Malins served as a deputy judge and a recorder from 1990. The retirement age for such posts is 70 years.

Malins was retained by Cambridge Analytica to report on its political activities.

Political career
As well as being elected a councillor in the City of London, Malins also contested Pontefract and Castleford (UK Parliament constituency) for the Conservatives at the 1987 General Election, where he lost to Labour's Geoffrey Lofthouse.

Malins has now left the Conservative Party and has put himself up as a candidate for The Brexit Party for the Salisbury constituency in the next UK General Election.

He stood for Reform UK as a candidate for Wiltshire Police and Crime Commissioner in 2021, and came last in 6th place, finishing the election with 4,348 votes. Malins also stood in the subsequent by-election, when original winner Jonathon Seed was disqualified, but again finished last, with 1,859 first-preference votes (2.1%).

Personal life
His brother Humfrey Malins is British  Conservative Party politician.

See also
Dominic Grieve
Edward Bysshe
John Brightman, Baron Brightman

References

1950 births
Living people
Lawyers from London
Alumni of Brasenose College, Oxford
Alumni of The University of Law
Councilmen of the City of London
British King's Counsel
English barristers
Members of the Middle Temple
Reform UK politicians